Dwale is an unincorporated community and census-designated place in Floyd County, Kentucky, United States. The 2010 United States Census reported that Dwale's population was 329, of which 312 persons were white and 9 persons were Asian.

The origins of the name Dwale are unclear. Although it is said to have been named after a town in Wales, no such Welsh place name has been found.

Geography
Dwale is located in north-central Floyd County on the west side of the Levisa Fork, just north of Allen. U.S. Route 23 passes through Dwale, leading northwest  to Prestonsburg, the county seat, and southeast  to Pikeville.

Demographics

References

Census-designated places in Floyd County, Kentucky
Census-designated places in Kentucky